There are two base camps on Mount Everest, on opposite sides of the mountains: South Base Camp is in Nepal at an altitude of , while North Base Camp is in Tibet at .

The base camps are rudimentary campsites at the base of Mount Everest that are used by mountain climbers during their ascent and descent. They are also visited by hikers. South Base Camp is used when climbing via the southeast ridge, while North Base Camp is used when climbing via the northeast ridge.

Supplies are shipped to the South Base Camp by porters, and with the help of animals, usually yaks. The North Base Camp is accessed by a paved road that branches from China National Highway 318. Climbers typically rest at base camp for several days for acclimatization, to reduce the risk of altitude sickness.

South Base Camp in Nepal
Trekkers usually fly from Kathmandu to Lukla to save time and energy before beginning the trek to the base camp. However, trekking to Lukla is possible. There are no roads from Kathmandu to Lukla and as a result, the only method of transporting large and heavy goods is by plane.

From Lukla, climbers trek upward to the Sherpa capital of Namche Bazaar, following the valley of the Dudh Kosi river. It takes about two days to reach the village, which is the central hub of the area. Typically at this point, climbers allow a day of rest for acclimatization. They then trek for another two days to Dingboche,  before resting for another day for further acclimatization. Most trekkers use the traditional trail via Tengboche monastery, but recently, the high trail via Mong La and Phortse has gained popularity due to the impressive views it offers. Another two days takes them to Everest Base Camp via Gorakshep, the flat field below Kala Patthar,  and Mt. Pumori.

On 25 April 2015, an earthquake measuring 7.8 on the moment magnitude scale, struck Nepal and triggered an avalanche on Pumori that swept through the South Base Camp. At least 19 people were said to have been killed as a result. Just over two weeks later, on 12 May, a second quake struck measuring 7.3 on the Mw. Some of the trails leading to Everest Base Camp were damaged by these earthquakes and needed repairs.

On 17 June 2022, it was announced that the camp will be moved 200-400m lower, since the Khumbu glacier, on which the campsite is located, is rapidly melting and thinning out, which makes it unsafe for the trekkers.

North Base Camp in Tibet

A visit to the North Base Camp requires a permit from the Chinese government, on top of the permit required to visit Tibet itself. Access to the North Base Camp has been closed to tourists since February 2019. Earlier, such permits could be arranged via travel companies in Lhasa as part of a package tour that included hiring a vehicle, driver, and guide. The road leads to Rongbuk Monastery, with dramatic views of the north face of Mount Everest. From the Rombuk guest house, all tourists were required to take the horse-drawn carriages or small buses managed by the government to limit the traffic in the last stretch of gravel road to a marked hill at 5,200 metres above sea level, just before the climbers' camp. It was also possible to trek up from the tourist camp, but only when properly acclimatized. The "tourist Base Camp" is located about halfway between Rongbuk Monastery; the actual climbers' Base Camp is at the foot of Rongbuk glacier.

See also
Gorakshep
List of Mount Everest expeditions

References

External links

Mount Everest
Buildings and structures in Solukhumbu District
Tingri County